Nezbedin Selimi (Albanian: Nexhedin Selimi) (born 6 October 1984 in Gostivar, Yugoslavia) is a Swiss–Albanian footballer who plays for FC Weinfelden-Bürglen.

References

Living people
1984 births
Swiss men's footballers
Swiss expatriate footballers
Swiss Super League players
Swiss expatriate sportspeople in Albania
Expatriate footballers in Albania
Association football midfielders
Albanian emigrants to Switzerland
People from Gostivar
Swiss people of Albanian descent
Swiss people of Macedonian descent
Kategoria Superiore players
NK Primorje players
NK Rudar Velenje players
KF Laçi players
Flamurtari Vlorë players
FC Frauenfeld players